The 2006 North Carolina Tar Heels baseball team represented the University of North Carolina in the 2006 NCAA Division I baseball season. The Tar Heels played their home games at the new Bryson Field at Boshamer Stadium. The team was coached by Mike Fox in his 6th season at North Carolina.

The Tar Heels lost the College World Series, defeated by the Oregon State Beavers in the championship series.

Roster

Schedule and results

! style="" | Regular Season (45–11)
|- valign="top"

|- align="center" bgcolor="#ccffcc"
| ||  || Boshamer Stadium • Chapel Hill, North Carolina || 8–3 || Woodard (1–0) || 1,175 || 1–0 || –
|- align="center" bgcolor="#ccffcc"
| || Seton Hall || Boshamer Stadium • Chapel Hill, North Carolina || 9–7 || Bard (1–0) || 355 || 2–0 || –
|- align="center" bgcolor="#ccffcc"
| || Seton Hall || Boshamer Stadium • Chapel Hill, North Carolina || 21–2 || Miller (1–0) || 355 || 3–0 || –
|- align="center" bgcolor="#ccffcc"
| ||  || Boshamer Stadium • Chapel Hill, North Carolina || 15–0 || Putkonen (1–0) || 485 || 4–0 || –
|- align="center" bgcolor="#ccffcc"
| ||  || Boshamer Stadium • Chapel Hill, North Carolina || 11–7 || Woodard (2–0) || 1,251 || 5–0 || –
|- align="center" bgcolor="#ccffcc"
| || George Washington || Boshamer Stadium • Chapel Hill, North Carolina || 6–5 || Hovis (1–0) || 859 || 6–0 || –
|- align="center" bgcolor="#ccffcc"
| || George Washington || Boshamer Stadium • Chapel Hill, North Carolina || 14–0 || Miller (2–0) || 805 || 7–0 || –
|-

|- align="center" bgcolor="#ccffcc"
| ||  || Boshamer Stadium • Chapel Hill, North Carolina || 11–8 || Hovis (2–0) || 759 || 8–0 || –
|- align="center" bgcolor="#ffcccc"
| ||  || Boshamer Stadium • Chapel Hill, North Carolina || 4–5 || Hovis (2–1) || 1,005 || 8–1 || –
|- align="center" bgcolor="#ccffcc"
| || Purdue || Boshamer Stadium • Chapel Hill, North Carolina || 5–2 || Bard (2–0) || 1,152 || 9–1 || –
|- align="center" bgcolor="#ccffcc"
| || Purdue || Boshamer Stadium • Chapel Hill, North Carolina || 7–3 || Miller (3–0) || 952 || 10–1 || –
|- align="center" bgcolor="#ccffcc"
| ||  || Boshamer Stadium • Chapel Hill, North Carolina || 6–4 || Putkonen (2–0) || 455 || 11–1 || –
|- align="center" bgcolor="#ffcccc"
| || at  || Ernie Shore Field • Winston-Salem, North Carolina || 5–6 || Danford (0–1) || 413 || 11–2 || 0–1
|- align="center" bgcolor="#ccffcc"
| || at Wake Forest || Ernie Shore Field • Winston-Salem, North Carolina || 3–0 || Bard (3–0) || 919 || 12–2 || 1–1
|- align="center" bgcolor="#ccffcc"
| || at Wake Forest || Ernie Shore Field • Winston-Salem, North Carolina || 5–1 || Miller (4–0) || 1,501 || 13–2 || 2–1
|- align="center" bgcolor="#ccffcc"
| ||  || Boshamer Stadium • Chapel Hill, North Carolina || 9–5 || Danford (1–1) || 115 || 14–2 || 2–1
|- align="center" bgcolor="#ccffcc"
| || George Mason || Boshamer Stadium • Chapel Hill, North Carolina || 7–4 || Hovis (3–1) || 205 || 15–2 || 2–1
|- align="center" bgcolor="#ffcccc"
| ||  || Boshamer Stadium • Chapel Hill, North Carolina || 8–15 || Bard (3–1) || 853 || 15–3 || 2–2
|- align="center" bgcolor="#ccffcc"
| || Maryland || Boshamer Stadium • Chapel Hill, North Carolina || 11–7 || Hovis (4–1) || 1,125 || 16–3 || 3–2
|- align="center" bgcolor="#ccffcc"
| || Maryland || Boshamer Stadium • Chapel Hill, North Carolina || 10–3 || Danford (2–1) || 1,050 || 17–3 || 4–2
|- align="center" bgcolor="#ccffcc"
| ||  || Boshamer Stadium • Chapel Hill, North Carolina || 11–2 || Warren (1–0) || 105 || 18–3 || 4–2
|- align="center" bgcolor="#ccffcc"
| || Towson || Boshamer Stadium • Chapel Hill, North Carolina || 11–3 || Putkonen (3–0) || 353 || 19–3 || 4–2
|- align="center" bgcolor="#ccffcc"
| || at  || Russ Chandler Stadium • Atlanta, Georgia || 2–0 || Miller (5–0) || 1,243 || 20–3 || 5–2
|- align="center" bgcolor="#ffcccc"
| || at Georgia Tech || Russ Chandler Stadium • Atlanta, Georgia || 1–11 || Bard (3–2) || 1,397 || 20–4 || 5–3
|- align="center" bgcolor="#ffcccc"
| || at Georgia Tech || Russ Chandler Stadium • Atlanta, Georgia || 2–3 || Woodard (2–1) || 2,201 || 20–5 || 5–4
|- align="center" bgcolor="#ccffcc"
| ||  || Boshamer Stadium • Chapel Hill, North Carolina || 3–1 || Hovis (5–1) || 665 || 21–5 || 5–4
|- align="center" bgcolor="#ccffcc"
| ||  || Boshamer Stadium • Chapel Hill, North Carolina || 4–0 || Miller (6–0) || 2,555 || 22–5 || 6–4
|-

|- align="center" bgcolor="#ccffcc"
| || Florida State || Boshamer Stadium • Chapel Hill, North Carolina || 4–3 || Woodard (3–1) || 2,151 || 23–5 || 7–4
|- align="center" bgcolor="#ffcccc"
| || Florida State || Boshamer Stadium • Chapel Hill, North Carolina || 5–6 || Hovis (5–2) || 2,395 || 23–6 || 7–5
|- align="center" bgcolor="#ccffcc"
| ||  || Boshamer Stadium • Chapel Hill, North Carolina || 9–1 || Putkonen (4–0) || 959 || 24–6 || 7–5
|- align="center" bgcolor="#ccffcc"
| ||  || Boshamer Stadium • Chapel Hill, North Carolina || 23–7 || Banford (3–1) || 599 || 25–6 || 7–5
|- align="center" bgcolor="#ccffcc"
| || at Miami (FL) || Mark Light Field • Coral Gables, Florida || 8–7 || Miller  (7–0) || 2,216 || 26–6 || 8–5
|- align="center" bgcolor="#ffcccc"
| || at Miami (FL) || Mark Light Field • Coral Gables, Florida || 7–9 || Carignan  (1–0) || 2,203 || 26–7 || 8–6
|- align="center" bgcolor="#ccffcc"
| || at Miami (FL) || Mark Light Field • Coral Gables, Florida || 9–6 || Hovis  (6–2) || 1,385 || 27–7 || 9–6
|- align="center" bgcolor="#ccffcc"
| || at Charlotte || Tom and Lib Phillips Field • Charlotte, North Carolina || 3–1 || Danford  (4–1) || 3,134 || 28–7 || 9–6
|- align="center" bgcolor="#ccffcc"
| ||  || Boshamer Stadium • Chapel Hill, North Carolina || 9–4 || Miller (8–0) || 2,325 || 29–7 || 10–6
|- align="center" bgcolor="#ccffcc"
| || Virginia Tech || Boshamer Stadium • Chapel Hill, North Carolina || 3–1 || Woodard (4–1) || 2,351 || 30–7 || 11–6
|- align="center" bgcolor="#ccffcc"
| || Virginia Tech || Boshamer Stadium • Chapel Hill, North Carolina || 12–4 || Bard (4–2) || 1,355 || 31–7 || 12–6
|- align="center" bgcolor="#ffcccc"
| || at  || UNCG Baseball Stadium • Greensboro, North Carolina || 6–7 || Facchinei (0–1) || 1,033 || 31–8 || 12–6
|- align="center" bgcolor="#ccffcc"
| ||  || Boshamer Stadium • Chapel Hill, North Carolina || 7–3 || Miller (9–0) || 3,656 || 32–8 || 13–6
|- align="center" bgcolor="#ccffcc"
| || NC State || Boshamer Stadium • Chapel Hill, North Carolina || 3–2 || Carignan (1–1) || 2,195 || 33–8 || 14–6
|- align="center" bgcolor="#ccffcc"
| || NC State || Boshamer Stadium • Chapel Hill, North Carolina || 4–0 || Bard (5–2) || 3,153 || 34–8 || 15–6
|- align="center" bgcolor="#ccffcc"
| ||  || Boshamer Stadium • Chapel Hill, North Carolina || 6–3 || Putkonen (9–0) || 557 || 35–8 || 15–6
|- align="center" bgcolor="#ccffcc"
| ||  || Boshamer Stadium • Chapel Hill, North Carolina || 7–3 || Trice (1–0) || 105 || 36–8 || 15–6
|- align="center" bgcolor="#ccffcc"
| || at  || Jack Coombs Field • Durham, North Carolina || 8–4 || Miller (10–0) || 1,927 || 37–8 || 16–6
|- align="center" bgcolor="#ccffcc"
| || at Duke || Jack Coombs Field • Durham, North Carolina || 8–2 || Woodard (5–1) || 1,555 || 38–8 || 17–6
|- align="center" bgcolor="#ccffcc"
| || at Duke || Jack Coombs Field • Durham, North Carolina || 7–1 || Bard (6–2) || 1,032 || 39–8 || 18–6
|-

|- align="center" bgcolor="#ccffcc"
| ||  || Boshamer Stadium • Chapel Hill, North Carolina || 6–3 || Danford (5–1) || 715 || 40–8 || 18–6
|- align="center" bgcolor="#ffcccc"
| ||  || Boshamer Stadium • Chapel Hill, North Carolina || 8–12 || Carignan (1–2) || 757 || 40–9 || 18–6
|- align="center" bgcolor="#ffcccc"
| || at  || Davenport Field at UVA Baseball Stadium • Charlottesville, Virginia || 1–4 || Miller (10–1) || 2,624 || 40–10 || 18–7
|- align="center" bgcolor="#ccffcc"
| || at Virginia || Davenport Field at UVA Baseball Stadium • Charlottesville, Virginia || 5–0 || Woodard (6–1) || 2,624 || 41–10 || 19–7
|- align="center" bgcolor="#ccffcc"
| || at Virginia || Davenport Field at UVA Baseball Stadium • Charlottesville, Virginia || 2–9 || Bard (6–3) || 2,119 || 41–11 || 19–8
|- align="center" bgcolor="#ccffcc"
| || UNC Greensboro|| Boshamer Stadium • Chapel Hill, North Carolina || 7–0 || Putkonen (6–0) || 858 || 42–11 || 19–8
|- align="center" bgcolor="#ccffcc"
| ||  || Boshamer Stadium • Chapel Hill, North Carolina || 7–1 || Miller (11–1) || 255 || 43–11 || 20–8
|- align="center" bgcolor="#ccffcc"
| || Boston College || Boshamer Stadium • Chapel Hill, North Carolina || 5–2 || Hovis (7–2) || 1,915 || 44–11 || 21–8
|- align="center" bgcolor="#ccffcc"
| || Boston College || Boshamer Stadium • Chapel Hill, North Carolina || 5–1 || Bard (7–3) || 2,158 || 45–11 || 22–8
|- align="center" bgcolor="white"

|-
! style="" | Postseason (9–4)
|-

|- align="center" bgcolor="#ffcccc"
| || vs NC State || Baseball Grounds of Jacksonville • Jacksonville, Florida || 3–9 || Miller (11–2) || 16,444 || 45–12 || 22–8
|- align="center" bgcolor="#ffcccc"
| || vs Florida State || Baseball Grounds of Jacksonville • Jacksonville, Florida || 6–7 || Carignan (1–3) || 17,236 || 45–13 || 22–8
|-

|- align="center" bgcolor="#ccffcc"
| ||  || Boshamer Stadium • Chapel Hill, North Carolina || 15–7 || Danford (6–1) || 1,815 || 46–13 || 22–8
|- align="center" bgcolor="#ccffcc"
| || Winthrop || Boshamer Stadium • Chapel Hill, North Carolina || 14–4 || Miller (12–2) || 2,915 || 47–13 || 22–8
|- align="center" bgcolor="#ccffcc"
| || Winthrop || Boshamer Stadium • Chapel Hill, North Carolina || 14–2 || Bard (8–3) || 2,857 || 48–13 || 22–8
|-

|- align="center" bgcolor="#ccffcc"
| || at  || Sewell–Thomas Stadium • Tuscaloosa, Alabama || 11–5 || Miller (13–2) || 5,240 || 49–13 || 22–8
|- align="center" bgcolor="#ccffcc"
| || at Alabama || Sewell–Thomas Stadium • Tuscaloosa, Alabama || 8–7 || Carignan (2–3) || 5,420 || 50–13 || 22–8
|-

|- align="center" bgcolor="#ccffcc"
| || vs  || Johnny Rosenblatt Stadium • Omaha, Nebraska || 7–5 || Danford (7–1) || 23,385 || 51–13 || 22–8
|- align="center" bgcolor="#ccffcc"
| || vs Clemson || Johnny Rosenblatt Stadium • Omaha, Nebraska || 2–0 || Woodard (7–1) || 21,329 || 52–13 || 22–8
|- align="center" bgcolor="#ccffcc"
| || vs Cal State Fullerton || Johnny Rosenblatt Stadium • Omaha, Nebraska || 6–5 || Bard (9–3) || 17,000 || 53–13 || 22–8
|- align="center" bgcolor="#ccffcc"
| || vs Oregon State || Johnny Rosenblatt Stadium • Omaha, Nebraska || 4–3 || Hovis (8–2) || 26,808 || 54–13 || 22–8
|- align="center" bgcolor="#ffcccc"
| || vs Oregon State || Johnny Rosenblatt Stadium • Omaha, Nebraska || 7–11 || Danford (7–2) || 25,046 || 54–14 || 22–8
|- align="center" bgcolor="#ffcccc"
| || vs Oregon State || Johnny Rosenblatt Stadium • Omaha, Nebraska || 2–3 || Bard (9–4) || 18,565 || 54–15 || 22–8
|- align="center" bgcolor="white"

| Schedule Source:

Awards and honors 
Tim Federowicz
All Tournament Team

Jay Cox
All Tournament Team

Tar Heels in the 2006 MLB Draft
The following members of the North Carolina Tar Heels baseball program were drafted in the 2006 Major League Baseball Draft.

References

North Carolina
North Carolina Tar Heels baseball seasons
North Carolina Tar Heels baseball
College World Series seasons
North Carolina